As of December 2017, the European Union had a total installed wind capacity of 169.3gigawatts (GW). In 2017, a total of 15,680 MW of wind power was installed, representing 55% of all new power capacity, and the wind power generated 336 TWh of electricity, enough to supply 11.6% of the EU's electricity consumption.

In the future, wind power is likely to continue to grow in the European Union. According to a European Environment Agency report, wind energy can play a major role in achieving the European renewable energy targets.

The European Wind Energy Association (now WindEurope) has estimated that 230 gigawatts of wind capacity will be installed in Europe by 2020, consisting of 190 GW onshore and 40 GW offshore. This would produce 14-17% of the EU's electricity, avoiding 333 million tonnes of CO2 per year and saving Europe €28 billion a year in fuel costs.

Research from a wide variety of sources in various European countries shows that support for wind power is consistently about 80 per cent among the general public.

By 2020, 56% wind power penetration was achieved in Denmark, 36% in Lithuania,  35% in Ireland, 23% in Portugal, 23% in Germany, 20% in Spain, 18% in Greece, 16% in Sweden, 15% (avg) in the EU

By country

Denmark 

In 2014 wind power in Denmark provided some 39 per cent of Danish domestic electricity and Denmark is a leading wind power nation in the world. The Danes were pioneers in developing commercial wind power during the 1970s and today almost half of the wind turbines around the world are produced by Danish manufacturers such as Vestas and Siemens Wind Power.

The Danish wind turbine industry is the world's largest and 90% of the wind turbines manufactured in Denmark are sold to international markets. In 2003, the Danish manufacturers had a total world market share of approximately 38%, generating a combined turnover of almost 3 billion Euro and maintaining over 20,000 people employed in the industry, from wind turbine factories to maintenance and research.

The development of wind power in Denmark has been characterised by a close collaboration between publicly financed research and industry in key areas such as research and development, certification, testing, and the preparation of standards.

Estonia 

As of 2013, the installed capacity of wind power in Estonia was 269.4 MW, while roughly 1466.5 MW worth of projects are currently being developed and three major offshore projects with total capacity of 1490 MW are being planned. Estonia, as a country, which is widely open to the sea and has a flat territory, possesses a very high potential for the development of wind energy.

According to a survey carried out by the Estonian Ministry of the Environment, 95% of the respondents considered wind power as the most environmentally friendly way to produce energy.

Finland

Germany 

Wind power plays an important role in Germany's renewable energy mix. In October 2014, the installed domestic capacity amounted to 35,678 megawatts, of which offshore contributed 616 MW.

In 2014, wind generated more than 51 terawatt-hours of electricity and contributed about 9.7% to the nations total net-generated electricity. This is 1.3% more than the year before. December 2014 was the best month, generating 8.9 TWh and on par with record-breaking month of December 2011. Along with the generated electricity of 18.5 TWh (3.5%) from hydro, 32.8 TWh (6.2%) from solar, and 54 TWh (10.0%) from biomass, all four renewable energy sources generated 154 TWh or about 30% of the nation's total net-generation. Electricity production from combined wind and solar has now achieved almost the level of nuclear power (84.2 TWh vs. 91.8 TWh).

More than 21,607 wind turbines are located in the German federal area and the country has plans to build more wind turbines. As of 2011, Germany's federal government is working on a new plan for increasing renewable energy commercialisation, with a particular focus on offshore wind farms.

Greece 

Wind power in Greece was due to expand by 352% by 2010 to meet the European target of 20% coverage of energy needs from renewable sources. Previously, there were 1,028 wind turbines installed throughout Greece and the number was set to reach 2,587 wind turbines before the end of 2010.

According to the Ministry of Environment and Public Works, the system would have a nameplate capacity of 3,372MW of power from wind alone compared to 746MW at the end of 2006. Greece chose to invest primarily to wind power by 77%, while the rest of renewable sources altogether comprise the remaining 23% of production with hydroelectric power being second with 11%.

Ireland 

Ireland is the best location in Europe for wind power as it is situated on the Western edge of Europe and is exposed to high winds from the Atlantic Ocean and Irish Sea. Wind power capacity factors tend to be higher in Ireland than anywhere else. By the end of 2019 the installed capacity of wind power in Ireland was 4,155 megawatts, generating 36.3% of Ireland's electrical power in 2020.

Most wind farms in Ireland are located in coastal regions and especially in the West of Ireland. However, the Irish Sea is getting some attention and the first offshore wind farm in Ireland is located a few kilometres north of Arklow and 10 km out to sea and is known as the Arklow Bank Wind Park. This is set to expand in the future. Other proposals are an offshore wind farm on the Kish Bank which is about 15 kilometers offshore from Dublin, the capital city. With another planned wind farm at Clogherhead (north of Drogheda, south of Dundalk), to be called the Oriel Wind Farm. The Codling windfarm, planned for the south Irish Sea, will have a capacity of 1100 MW with 330 turbines, giving a huge boost to wind generated power in Ireland.

Lithuania 
The Lithuanian government is planning on mimicking Baltic neighbour Denmark, which generates 20 per cent of its energy with wind turbines. Lithuanian government have plans to build 200 megawatts of renewable energy by 2010 in wind turbines.

Romania 

As of 2016, wind power in Romania has an installed capacity of about 3,028 MW, up from the 14 MW installed capacity in 2009.
The main regions of great potential of wind are Northern Dobruja and Moldavia.

Spain 

In 2011, Spain was Europe's leading producer of wind energy and ranked second only behind Germany in terms of installed capacity. In 2012, domestic capacity amounted to 22,785 MW. Wind power alone covered 16.6% of the total electricity demand in Spain in 2010 (according to Red Eléctrica de España, the Spanish system operator) and continues as the third technology in the system, after nuclear power and combined cycles. Wind energy's installed capacity could meet the electricity needs of two-thirds of Spanish households. In 2010, the electricity sector reduced its CO2 emissions by 26% thanks to wind energy. "Spain holds these positions as a result of the establishment of a stable regulatory framework, better understanding of the resource, and improved technology that have afforded considerable cost reduction in terms of initial investment, maintenance, and exploitation".

United Kingdom 

Update: It should be noted the United Kingdom is no longer in the European Union.

By the beginning of March 2022, the UK had 11,091 wind turbines with a total installed capacity of over 24.6gigawatts (GW): 14.1GW of onshore capacity and 10.4GW of offshore capacity, the sixth largest capacity of any country in 2019.

1.8 GW of new wind power capacity was brought online during 2012, a 30% increase of the total UK installed capacity. 2012 was a significant year for the offshore wind industry with 4 large wind farms becoming operational with over 1.1 GW of generating capability coming on stream.

Through the Renewables Obligation, British electricity suppliers are now required by law to provide a proportion of their sales from renewable sources such as wind power or pay a penalty fee. The supplier then receives a Renewables Obligation Certificate (ROC) for each MW·h of electricity they have purchased. Within the United Kingdom, wind power is the second largest source of renewable energy after biomass.

Wind power is expected to continue growing in the United Kingdom for the foreseeable future – RenewableUK estimated in 2010 that more than 2,000 MW of capacity would be deployed per year for the next five years. By 2020, the United Kingdom is expected to have more than 28,000 MW of wind capacity. By 2050, UK government plans to cut carbon emissions to zero by using wind power.

Europe's Wind Energy Event

In the Europe's Premier Wind Energy Event February 2013 wind was evaluated by Robert Clover from MAKE Consulting as the cheapest electricity technology after 2020 meeting 50% of electricity demand in Europe by 2050. According to Fatih Birol, Chief Economist at the International Energy Agency, without phasing out fossil fuel subsidies, the EU will not reach its climate targets. The fossil fuel subsidies were half a trillion dollars in 2011. The biggest challenges of wind energy is the lack of predictability of government policies, and not the lack of predictability of wind power, according to Birol. Retroactive policy changes have also undermined investment in renewable energy projects. The European wind industry needs skilled workforce. The EU wind energy capacity in the end of 2012 was 105.6 GW. Renewable energy represented 69% of new power capacity in 2012, while fuel oil, coal and nuclear capacity saw negative growth due to decommissioning.

Public opinion
Recent public opinion surveys about wind power at both the EU and the country level shows that wind energy, being a clean and renewable energy source, is traditionally linked to very strong and stable levels of public support. About 80 per cent of EU citizens support wind power. Despite overwhelming popular support in the abstract, wind farm projects at times raise local opposition, especially in locations closer to populations or to woodland wildlife. For instance, a wind project in Ripfjallet, Sweden in 2020 has been opposed by a group of local residents who wish to maintain the historical landscape. They succeeded in arranging a local referendum scheduled for 22 June 2020 to determine the future of the project. In Germany, a government agency found that there were 325 active lawsuits against wind projects as of January 2020, often on the basis of protecting ecology and wildlife.

Statistics

Installed wind power capacity

Per capita capacity
Wind power today, in an average wind year, generates the equivalent of over 20% of Denmark's electricity use and 25–30% of that in three German Länder, and on windy days with light loads, over 100% of the load in certain regions, particularly in West Denmark, North Germany, and northern Spain.

Leading EU countries by wind power production

See also
Installed wind power capacity
European Wind Energy Association (EWEA)
Global Wind Energy Council
Renewable energy in the European Union
Renewable-energy economy
Wind power by country
European countries by fossil fuel use (% of total energy)

References

External links
The European Wind Energy Association
European Wind Energy Conference and Exhibition
Wind Power Seen As Key Part Of Europe’s 20% Renewable Energy Target
EWEA: 180 GW of Wind Power Possible in Europe by 2020
Europe’s biggest onshore wind farm plugs into the national grid
Offshore wind to take EU by storm?
WindEurope Annual Statistics